Horsfield Bay is a locality of the Central Coast region of New South Wales, Australia  west of Woy Woy between Brisbane Water National Park and Woy Woy Inlet. It is part of the  local government area.

Demographics

In the 2016 Census, there were 544 people in Horsfield Bay. 71.0% of people were born in Australia and 83.5% of people spoke only English at home. The most common responses for religion were No Religion 37.7% and Catholic 20.8%.

References

Suburbs of the Central Coast (New South Wales)